{{DISPLAYTITLE:C3H5N}}
The molecular formula C3H5N (molar mass: 55.08 g/mol, exact mass: 55.0422 u) may refer to:

 1-Azabicyclo[1.1.0]butane
 1-Azetine (dihydroazete)
 2-Azetine
 Propargylamine (2-propynylamine)
 Propionitrile (propanenitrile)